Edmond Ardisson (23 October 1904, in Marseille – 30 November 1983, in Jouarre) was a French actor. He appeared in more than ninety films between 1938 and 1983.

Filmography

External links

1904 births
1983 deaths
French male film actors
20th-century French male actors
Male actors from Marseille
German male poets